The Continental Cup is a curling tournament held annually between teams from North America (sometimes just Canada) against teams from the rest of the World (sometimes just Europe). Each side is represented by six teams (three women's teams and three men's teams), which compete using a unique points system.  The tournament is modeled after golf's Ryder Cup., but unlike the Ryder Cup, the Continental Cup has never been held outside of North America nor has it been a regular, biennial event. The inaugural Continental Cup was held in 2002 but was held only three times between 2005 and 2010. Since 2011, however, the Continental Cup has been an annual competition.

Conceived as a joint collaboration between Curling Canada, World Curling Federation, and United States Curling Association, it has been operated solely by Curling Canada since 2015.

As of 2020, Team North America/Team Canada has won the Continental Cup ten times. Team World/Europe has won the Cup six times.

The event was last held in 2020, and was cancelled twice during the COVID-19 pandemic. Curling Canada announced that the event will not go ahead for the 2022–23 season.

Competition Overview 

The Continental Cup pits curling teams from North America in a competition against teams from Europe and Asia, with each side of the competition represented by six curling teams. For the majority of the Continental Cup competitions, Team North America has competed against a varied combination of teams designated as Team World. Team Canada has exclusively represented North America twice (2015 & 2020). During those same years, a formally designated Team Europe has been the opponent, though in many years the team formally named as Team World has only been represented by teams from European nations (2002-2007, 2013 and 2019). In all other years where Team World was formed, teams from China or Japan competed in the Continental Cup.

Curling Canada determines Team Canada's participants, based on previous Canada Cup, national championship, and CTRS standings. Team World's and Team Europe's representatives are generally determined by the World Curling Federation. For Team World/Europe, Sweden is the only country to have been formally been represented in each of the Continental Cup competitions, but only because Niklas Edin joined team Scotland in 2007, which was skipped by David Murdoch. Murdoch's team also welcomed Edin to form a Scotland-Sweden team in 2008, though Anette Norberg returned to the competition that year as well to represent Sweden. In 2011, Murdoch also skipped a Scottish-Swiss-German team composed of Ralph Stöckli, Andreas Lang, and Simon Strübin.

A list of the championships illustrates the variations in the competition's participants over the last two decades. It also illustrates that the majority of events have taken place in Canada, though four have taken place in the United States (in Las Vegas, Nevada).

 The event was tied 30–30 after completion of the skins events, so to break the tie, each team selected one thrower to draw to the button, with North America's Brad Gushue coming closer to Team World's Thomas Ulsrud.

Competition format and scoring 

Currently, the Continental Cup competition consists of five event categories in eleven draws taking place over four days. The events include (1) two draws of traditional team play (one men's and one women's), (2) two draws of team scrambles (one men's and one women's), (3) three draws of mixed doubles, (4) two mixed team scrambles, and (5) two skins games. Each draw of each event contributes to a single overall score for the competing teams. For either team to claim the Continental Cup, therefore, a minimum majority of the points must be cumulatively attained from the results in the combined events over eleven draws.

The current points system was implemented in 2013. The minimum majority of the points is 30½ points. Currently, for the first nine draws, all match-ups earn only one point for the winner, and a half-point for a tie. In 2019, the Competition had an extra mixed doubles draw and one draw of mixed scrambles, fifteen points were allocated to each skins draw. The 2020 reorganization establishing the current format also allowed the scoring to allocate 18 points for the final skins draw. As a result, only 27 points are now available over the first three days and nine draws, with 33 points available on the final day in the skins games.

The current competition evolved through different formats. Historically, the Cup consisted of four events – teams, mixed doubles, team scrambles, and "singles", the last of these being contests in which the teams competed in a series of skills. The two major changes were the elimination of the singles events, and the reduction of traditional team play, with increased mixed doubles and introduction of mixed scrambles. Prior to 2013, the minimum majority of the points was also 201 points. The format and scoring were revamped to heighten the stakes of each day of play, with the highest stakes on the final day of competition.

Teams 

The traditional team component of the Continental Cup currently consists of six eight-end games, with each team playing a single traditional game. One point is awarded to the winner, with a half point if the game is tied after eight ends.

Prior to 2013, there were only twelve team curling games, with six points awarded to the winner of each game. From 2013 to 2018 there were eighteen team games split into six draws. In 2019, twelve of these games were replaced by two rounds of team scrambles, one round of mixed scrambles (3 games) and an extra round of mixed doubles. Thus, as of 2019, each of the teams in their normal tour constellations only competed as such once. Currently, the remainder of the four person teams are allocated to team scrambles (two draws, one men's and one women's) and two mixed scrambles (currently two draws).

Results

Mixed doubles 

Until 2020, the mixed doubles component consists of twelve games, with each player competing in one mixed doubles game. One point is awarded to the winner, with a half point if the game is tied after eight ends. In 2020, the number of games was reduced to 9, such that each player must play in one mixed doubles game and or one of the mixed scrambles.

Prior to 2007, each team consisted of two sweepers and two throwers, where one man and one woman was to play each position. By tradition, each men's rink was paired with a women's rink to make two teams for this event, with each mixed team being given as the names of the two throwers. All 24 players on each side were required to play in either a sweeping or throwing role in this format. Starting in 2007, however, sweepers were eliminated to create a true "doubles" game, and any sweeping is to be done by either the thrower or the skip. In the past, six points would have been given for a win, and three points would have been given for a tie.

The rules from this event (with the 2007 revision) were later adopted as a separate curling discipline with the inauguration of the World Mixed Doubles Curling Championship in 2008, and became an Olympic discipline ten years later.

Results

Team scramble 

The team scramble competition was added to the Cup in 2019. The men's and women's teams are mixed up into same-gender lineups. No team may consist of a front-end or back-end from the same team. As of 2019, there are six games, each worth one point, with a half point if the game is tied after eight ends.

Results

Mixed team scramble 

The mixed team scramble competition was also added to the 2019 event. In 2020, this consisted of two draws (of three games each) but scrambled with four players so that they none can play with their normal mixed teams. In one round, one team from each side is be skipped by a female player, and for the other round, the teams are skipped by a male player. One point is awarded to the winner, with a half-point if the game is tied after eight ends.

Results

Skins 
The final event, and the event worth the most points, is the skins portion. As of the most recent cup, 33 points can be claimed in the combined skins draws, meaning that neither team can clinch the Continental Cup until the skins games are played. As of 2013, there were a total of five points, with half-point skins in the first six ends of the game and one-point skins in the final two ends. In 2020, this was modified so each skins game was worth six points, with a total of eighteen points available for the final draw. Prior to 2013, teams could claim 260 points in the skins games, and the points were distributed in an uneven manner through each of the eight ends, resulting in a different total point value for each skins game, but in 2019 this was changed to the current scoring system so that at least half of the points were up for grabs on the final day of play.

In order for a team to claim a skin, the team must either score at least two points with the hammer or force a steal without the hammer. In the skins competitions, blank ends will turn the hammer over to the opposing team. If after eight ends there remain points to be claimed, a draw to the button determines which team will get the points.

The points for the skins games were distributed as follows:

From 2002 to 2007, there were six skins games, three men's and three women's, with the games worth 30, 40, and 60 points. The games were typically referred to as the "A", "B", and "C" games. From 2007 to 2012, eight skins games were played. Three were worth 20 points, three were worth 30 points and the remaining two were worth 55 points. Three men's skins games and three women's skins games were played, with the remaining "A" and "B" game featuring mixed teams. The teams playing in the featured games, also known as the "C" games, were required to contribute two players, one male and one female, to both mixed skins games, while the teams playing in the "A" skins game must contribute two players, one male and one female, to the "B" mixed skins game, and vice versa. The featured skins game was played on the last day of competition, while the others were played on the same day as the singles events.  With the exception of the men's feature game in the 2003 cup, which was only played to seven ends with 13 points on the line in the eighth, all skins games are played to their conclusion, even if the Continental Cup has been clinched by one side partway through, or before all matches have been played (as was the case in 2007, when North America had clinched the Continental Cup before either of the feature skins game were played).

Results

Singles 
The singles competition is akin to a skills competition. There are six singles matches (three women's and three men's), with one point given to the winner of each match. In the past, four points would be given to the winner of each match, and eight bonus points would be awarded to the team with the higher aggregate score for the singles events. By convention, each of the matches pit teams against each other. Prior to 2007, one team member was to throw all six shots, while the non-throwers must sweep or skip for the thrower. Beginning in 2007, however, each member of the team must make at least one shot, and no member may make more than two shots. The singles event was discontinued in 2016.

Each singles match is determined based on a points system (with 0 for missing the shot entirely, 1 if the shot remains in play but outside the house, and higher points based on where the shooter eventually lands, up to a maximum of 5 points if the shooter reaches the button), and the team with the higher score wins the game. Three of the shots must be in-turns, while the other three must be out-turns, with the shots set up according to their chosen type of turn.  The six shots are as follows:
 the runthrough — the shooter must hit their own center guard, which then must hit an opposing rock at the back of the button. The position of the hit guard determines the point value of the shot.
 the draw to the button - a simple draw to the button.
 the draw through a port - the shooter must draw their rock between two opposing rocks (a corner guard and a center guard on the opposite side of the center line).  Points are only awarded if the thrown rock passes through the two opposing rocks without hitting either rock.
 the raise - the shooter must hit their own centre guard so that the guard is raised into the house. The position of the raised guard determines the point value of the shot.
 the hit-and-roll - the shooter must hit an opposing stone on a corner guard outside the house and then roll towards the center of the house. The hit stone must be completely removed from play in order to score points.
 the double takeout - the shooter must remove two opposing stones, one at the top of the four-foot and one at the back of the button.  Both stones must be completely removed from play in order to score points. The position of the shooter determines the point value of the shot.

To determine the singles matchups, one team captain must choose one rink while the other captain chooses the rink opposing them. One captain will choose first for the first women's matchup and the second men's matchup, while the other captain chooses first for the first men's matchup and the second women's matchup.  All women's games are completed before the men's games, and all shots of one type must be completed before the next shot is done. The team throwing first in one shot (which will be the same team in all three matches) will throw second in the next shot. The right to make the first shot in the runthrough alternates between the two teams every year.

Results

Similar events in other sports
Ryder Cup — Men's golf
Solheim Cup — Women's golf
Mosconi Cup — Nine-ball pool
Weber Cup — Ten-pin bowling
IAAF World Cup — Athletics
NFL Global Junior Championship — American Football, includes a Team Europe

References

External links 

 
International curling competitions